A by-election was held for the New South Wales Legislative Assembly electorate of Auburn on 9 November 1946 following the resignation of Jack Lang to successfully contest the seat of Reid at the 1946 federal election. His son, Chris Lang, won the by-election for his father's old seat.

Results

		

Jack Lang resigned to successfully contest the seat of Reid at the 1946 federal election.

See also
Electoral results for the district of Auburn
List of New South Wales state by-elections

References

1946 elections in Australia
New South Wales state by-elections
1940s in New South Wales
November 1946 events in Australia